Sir Mark Arthur Wall (born 4 March 1963) is a British High Court judge. 

Wall was born in London, England and grew up in Worcestershire. He was educated at King Charles I School in Kidderminster and completed a BA at St John's College, Cambridge in 1984. 

He was called to the bar at Lincoln's Inn in 1985 and developed a practice in criminal law based at Citadel Chambers. He was appointed a recorder in 2002, took silk in 2006, and was leader of the Midland circuit from 2011 to 2014. In 2013, he was appointed a deputy High Court judge in the Administrative Court and was appointed a circuit judge a year later. He was a member of the Bar Council from 2008 to 2014. 

On 1 October 2020, Wall was appointed a judge of the High Court, following the promotion of Sir Richard Arnold to the Court of Appeal, and he was assigned to the Queen's Bench Division. He received the customary knighthood in the same year.

In 1987, he married Carmel Adler (a circuit judge) and together they have a son and a daughter.

See also
Murder of Arthur Labinjo-Hughes

References 

Living people
1963 births
21st-century English judges
Knights Bachelor
Alumni of St John's College, Cambridge
Members of Lincoln's Inn
Queen's Bench Division judges
People educated at King Charles I School
English King's Counsel
21st-century King's Counsel